Cranio-Corpo-Graphy (CCG) is a medical investigation and measurement procedure developed in 1968 by German neurootologist Claus-Frenz Claussen. It documents and evaluates disorders of the equilibrium function measured by investigation procedures such as the Unterberger test, the LOLAVHESLIT test, the NEFERT test, the Romberg's test and the WOFEC test.

Method 

During investigation, the patient carries a worker's helmet with two lamps fixed on it on his head; two additional lamps are fixed on the patient's shoulders. An instant camera located above the patient records the patient's movements during investigation. A computer records the results and prints them into a polar coordinate system.

History 

After the Unterberger test, Romberg's test, and the WOFEC test were introduced, the deviations in the patient's movements were, at first, marked with chalk on the floor of the investigation room.

In 1927, Russian medician Talpis proposed a method to record the deviations using a camera and a light source. In 1960, A. Guettich introduced the light markers on a worker's helmet; evaluation of the light trace recordings, however, was aggravated by the photographic processing taking too much time. Introduction of cranio-corpo-graphy in 1968 made it possible to evaluate the recordings directly after the investigation by using an instant camera. In 1993, the method was further developed to US-CCG („Ultra-Sound Cranio-Corpo-Graphy“) by replacing the light markers through ultrasound markers.

Use 

Cranio-corpo-graphy is a tool within neurootological treatment and is used as an investigation procedure in working places with danger of falling hazards under the guidance of the German Accident Prevention Act G41 „Arbeiten mit Absturzgefahr“.

External links 
 Haralanov, S, Claussen C, Haralanova E, Shkodrova D.: „Computerized Ultrasonographic Craniocorpography and Abnormal Psychomotor Activity in Psychiatric Patients.“ Int Tinnitus J. 2002;8(2):72-76
 „Die Ultraschall-Cranio-Corpo-Graphie als Routine-Test in der neurootologischen Untersuchung“, Dissertation von Christian May an der Universität Würzburg (2005) (in German)

Literature 
 Online literature list of the Staatsbibliothek zu Berlin
 Claus-Frenz Claussen, J.V. DeSa: “Clinical Study of Human Equilibrium by Electronystagmography and Allied Tests.”, Popular Prakashan Bombay, Indien 1978
 Claus-Frenz Claussen, Burkard Franz: Contemporary and Practical Neurootology, Neurootologisches Forschungsinstitut der 4-G-Forschung e. V., Bad Kissingen 2006,

References 

Diagnostic neurology
Medical tests